NIU or Niu as a name can refer to:

Northern Illinois University (DeKalb, Illinois, United States)
Northland International University (Dunbar, Wisconsin, United States)
National Intelligence University (Bethesda, Maryland, United States)
National Ilan University (Yilan City, Yilan County, Taiwan)
Niue (ISO country code)
Niu (surname), Chinese surname
Network Interface Unit (telecommunications); see Network Interface Device (NID)
Niu Technologies, an electric scooter company headquartered in Changzhou, China
Niu Sale (born 1959), American football player
David Niu, Australian-American rugby league footballer and coach
Coconut, niu is the Hawaiian word